Collabrification came from the foundation of making mobile education more collaborative. From the start, it was designed to make something that was inherently non-collaborative and make it collaborative. The infrastructure has been used in the IMLC, University of Michigan, University of Texas, and the department of Mathematics and Information Technology at The Hong Kong Institute of Education. By building real-time, synchronous collaboration into mobile infrastructure, people build on the Four C's: critical thinking, communications, collaboration, and creativity. Collabrification of mobile and web applications allows people to build relationships, increase shared understanding, increase productivity, organize thoughts, and make mobile technology, specifically related to mobile applications, more fun and engaging.

Mobile collaboration
The first set of collabrified mobile apps were WeKWL, WeMap, WeSketch, WeCollabrify, YesWeKhan,

See also
Collaboration
Digital Collaboration
Collaborative leadership
Collaborative software
Collaborative innovation network
Cooperation
Problem solving
Critical thinking
Knowledge management
Learning circle
Mass collaboration

References

Collaborative projects
Mobile technology